Lawn bowls at the 2019 Pacific Games in Apia, Samoa was held on 8–13 July 2019. The tournament was played on the Faleata Lawn Bowls Greens at Tuanaimato. Medals were awarded in separate men's and women's lawn bowls events for singles, pairs, triples and fours.

Teams
The nations competing were:

Medal summary

Medal table

Men

Women

See also
 Lawn bowls at the Pacific Games

References

2019 Pacific Games
Lawn bowls at the Pacific Games
Pacific Games